Douglas Pearce, known professionally as Douglas P (born 27 April 1956), is an English folk musician, record label owner, photographer and actor who is best known for his neofolk project Death in June. Pearce was born in Sheerwater in Woking, Surrey, and currently resides in Australia, where he has lived since the mid 90s.

Early life 
Pearce was born on 27 April 1956, and grew up in Sheerwater, suburb of Woking in Surrey which he described as a "white, working-class ghetto", to a father who worked as a courier for the military, and had served in World War II. Both of his parents were English, though his mother claimed Scots-Irish ancestry.
His father died of a heart attack at age 56, when Pearce was 14. Pearce grew up in what he describes as "a very militaristic environment, surrounded by war", and says that he "had a natural attraction to war". At the age of 18 Pearce left home and hitchhiked around Europe and "came home a changed man".

As a child, Pearce was exorcised by his parents for alleged demonic possession, and after his father died, his mother and he would "muck around with a Ouija board". Pearce believes in the paranormal and occult, and claims to have had contact with various entities.

Sexual orientation 
Douglas P. is openly gay, and says that 'being gay is fundamental to Death in June', and expresses discontent with this side of Death in June not being explored in interviews. He describes the lack of coverage of this as 'incredulous' [sic]. His literary influences include Yukio Mishima and Jean Genet, whom he admires 'not only because their work was brilliant but that they were also gay. It adds so much.'

Musical work

Crisis

Pearce began his musical career in a British punk band called Crisis in 1977. After Crisis disbanded in 1980, Pearce formed Death in June with Crisis bandmate Tony Wakeford (currently of the English folk noir band, Sol Invictus) and Patrick O'Kill né Leagas (currently a member of the English band Mother Destruction).

Death in June

In 1985 Douglas P. became the sole constant member of Death in June, with rotating guest musicians serving as collaborators and live band members. Pearce continues working under the Death in June moniker to this day.

New European Recordings
Pearce has released numerous recordings of musical work of his own and others under his New European Recordings label since 1981.

Neofolk

Pearce was highly influential in the creation of a musical movement often referred to as neofolk, often collaborating and playing live with various artists within the genre. He served as a guitarist, drummer and occasional vocalist for experimental music group Current 93.

Discography

References

1956 births
Living people
English male singer-songwriters
British LGBT singers
English gay musicians
English people of Ulster-Scottish descent
English occultists
Exorcised people
Current 93 members
Death in June members
20th-century LGBT people
21st-century LGBT people